Rajnagar is the nearest village to Madhubani, Bihar, India. The ruins of the Rajnagar Palace, destroyed in the 1934 Nepal–Bihar earthquake, are located here.

History
Maharajadhiraj Sir Rameshwar Singh Jha  wanted to shift the headquarters of Raj Darbhanga from Darbhanga to Rajnagar and spent money in building palaces and temples and excavating or renovating tanks. The palaces were ruined almost beyond repair and the temples were also very badly damaged. The earthquake rendered the main palace through the Durga hall and the roof over the inner shrines into a mass of ruins and the marble image of the deity broke into pieces.

The Shiva temple built on the South Indian model was beyond repair.

The village has had electricity since 1959. A railway station of the North-Eastern Railway serves the village. The village is also the centre of trade in Euryale ferox (water berries).

Gallery

References

External links
 
    Bihar Govt. Official Website

Villages in Madhubani district
Populated places in Mithila, India